Simon Kander (December 21, 1848 – March 13, 1931) was an American businessman and politician.  He served one term in the Wisconsin State Assembly.

Biography

Born in Baltimore, Maryland, Kander went to Dickinson Seminary in Williamsport, Pennsylvania, and then moved to Titusville, Pennsylvania. In 1868, Kander moved with his parents to Milwaukee, Wisconsin. Kander was in the real estate business and was also a traveling salesman for a clothing firm. His wife was Lizzie Black Kander who was a progressive reformer. Kander served on the Milwaukee School Board. In 1907, Kander served in the Wisconsin State Assembly and was a Republican. Kander died in Milwaukee, Wisconsin, after a long illness.

He and his wife are distant relatives of former Missouri Secretary of State Jason Kander.

Notes

1848 births
1931 deaths
Politicians from Baltimore
People from Titusville, Pennsylvania
Politicians from Milwaukee
Lycoming College alumni
School board members in Wisconsin
Republican Party members of the Wisconsin State Assembly